Columbarium sinense is a species of large sea snail, marine gastropod mollusc in the family Turbinellidae.

Description

Distribution
This marine species was found off Hainan, China.

References

External links

Turbinellidae
Gastropods described in 2003